Greater Rio de Janeiro, officially the Rio de Janeiro Metropolitan Region (Grande Rio, officially Região Metropolitana do Rio de Janeiro, in Portuguese) is a large metropolitan area located in Rio de Janeiro state in Brazil, the second largest in Brazil and third largest in South America. It consists of 22 municipalities, including the state capital, Rio de Janeiro.

The metropolitan area of Rio de Janeiro is known as a historical, cultural and economic centre of Brazil, with a total population of 13 million inhabitants. The region was first officially defined on July 1, 1974, less than 1 year before the fusion of Guanabara into Rio de Janeiro. Several municipalities show a high level of conurbation, with Rio de Janeiro–Baixada Fluminense and Niterói–São Gonçalo being the most clear examples. It was changed several times to include or remove different cities in different moments of the history, in the years 1993, 2001, 2002, 2009, 2013 and 2018.

The water supply plans of the region are coordinated, and transportation in the area is heavily interconnected with urban intermunicipal buses to all municipalities in the area, trains over the capital to some Baixada Fluminense municipalities, ferry boats to some of the Guanabara Bay municipalities and major inter-city freeways such as the Rio–Niterói Bridge, Red Line, President Dutra freeway and the Niterói-Manilha freeway (pt). Most transportation methods are integrated with the capital inner-transportation system of buses, trains, metro, freeways and expressways.

Cities by Population (2018) 

1,000,000+
 Rio de Janeiro: 
 São Gonçalo: 

400,000 – 999,999
 Duque de Caxias: 
 Nova Iguaçu: 
 Niterói: 
 Belford Roxo: 
 São João de Meriti: 

100,000 – 399,999
 Petrópolis: 
 Magé: 
 Itaboraí: 
 Mesquita: 
 Nilópolis: 
 Maricá: 
 Queimados: 
 Itaguaí: 
 Japeri: 

0 - 100,000
 Seropédica: 
 Rio Bonito: 
 Guapimirim: 
 Cachoeiras de Macacu: 
 Paracambi: 
 Tanguá:

Statistics

 Population:  (2018 est.)
 Most populous city: Rio de Janeiro:  (2018 est.)
 Nominal GDP: R$413.93 Billion
 Largest GDP City: Rio de Janeiro City: R$282.5 billion (2013 est.)
 Nominal GDP per capita: R$33,856.54 (2013 est.)
 HDI: 0,771 (2010 est.)
 Highest HDI City: Niterói: 0,837 (2010 est.)

Municipalities

The 22 municipalities of the area are:

Notes and references 

Populated places in Rio de Janeiro (state)
Metropolitan areas of Brazil
Guanabara Bay